Czech Republic is scheduled to compete at the 2017 World Aquatics Championships in Budapest, Hungary from 14 July to 30 July.

Medalists

High diving

Czech Republic qualified one male high diver.

Open water swimming

The Czech Republic has entered four open water swimmers

Swimming

Czech swimmers have achieved qualifying standards in the following events (up to a maximum of 2 swimmers in each event at the A-standard entry time, and 1 at the B-standard):

Men

Women

Synchronized swimming

Czech Republic's synchronized swimming team consisted of 4 athletes (4 female).

Women

 Legend: (R) = Reserve Athlete

References

Nations at the 2017 World Aquatics Championships
Czech Republic at the World Aquatics Championships
2017 in Czech sport